The Chicago and Tomah Railroad was a proposal of D.K. Williams and was intended to connect the northern forests of Wisconsin around Tomah with the Galena and Southern Wisconsin Railroad which had reached Platteville in 1875. The Galena Road was a  narrow gauge line, so the Chicago and Tomah was constructed at the same gauge. The line was surveyed between Tomah and Lancaster with a proposed crossing of the Wisconsin River at Woodman. The river crossing and line north to Tomah never built but by 1879 the line had reached Lancaster from Woodman via Andersons Mill, Werley, Fennimore, Stitzer and Liberty. The Galena line connected with the line at Lancaster Junction one mile east of Fennimore.

In 1880, both lines were acquired by the Chicago and North Western Railroad which connected with them in 1881 at Montfort Junction with a standard gauge line from Madison. Also in 1881 the narrow gauge lines were converted to  except the section of the Chicago and Tomah between Fennimore and Woodman. This section could not be converted because of two horseshoe curves of 250 foot radius. This radius is extremely small even for narrow gauge operations and impossible for standard gauge operation. The line closed in 1926.

References

Sources
The Dinky, by Gregg Colton, Robert Felton and James Nickoll 1993 Marsh Lake Productions 

3 ft gauge railways in the United States
Defunct Wisconsin railroads
Predecessors of the Chicago and North Western Transportation Company
Defunct Illinois railroads